Gubernatorial elections in 2003 were held in 23 federal subjects of Russia. 16 incumbent governors re-elected.

Race summary

Notes

References

Gubernatorial elections in Russia
2003 elections in Russia